Melissa Ashby (born March 6, 1986) is a Grenadian former swimmer, who specialized in breaststroke events. Ashby qualified for the women's 100 m breaststroke at the 2004 Summer Olympics in Athens, by receiving a Universality place from FINA, in an entry time of 1:20.53. She challenged seven other swimmers in heat one, including Bolivia's Katerine Moreno, who competed at her third Olympics since 1988. She raced to fifth place in 1:22.67, just 2.14 seconds off her entry time. Ashby failed to advance into the semifinals, as she placed forty-fifth overall in the prelims.

References

1986 births
Living people
Grenadian female swimmers
Olympic swimmers of Grenada
Swimmers at the 2004 Summer Olympics
Female breaststroke swimmers